Jo Deman, from Leuven, Belgium is one of the 12 elected members of the World Scout Committee, the main executive body of the World Organization of the Scout Movement. He was elected to the Committee at the 41st World Scout Conference in Baku, Azerbaijan in 2017.

As a member of Scouts en Gidsen Vlaanderen, Deman had been East Brabant County Commissioner, later fulfilling several roles at European level.

Deman holds a master's degree in international politics from KU Leuven, and is an alumnus of Heilig Hartinstituut (School of the Holy Heart of Mary) in Heverlee. Professionally, he has worked for the European Youth Forum since 2011 as a membership and partnerships officer, and currently (2017) as a policy officer on Youth Work.

References

World Scout Committee members
Living people
Scouting and Guiding in Belgium
People from Leuven
KU Leuven alumni
1983 births